There are eight stadiums in use by California League baseball teams, all located in California. The oldest stadium is Excite Ballpark (1942) in San Jose, home of the San Jose Giants. The newest stadium is Banner Island Ballpark (2005) in Stockton, home of the Stockton Ports. Two stadiums were built in the 1940s, one in the 1950s, three in the 1990s, and two in the 2000s. The highest seating capacity is 10,650 at Chukchansi Park in Fresno, where the Fresno Grizzlies play. The lowest capacity is 2,468 at Valley Strong Ballpark in Visalia, where the Visalia Rawhide play.

Stadiums and Map

Gallery

See also

List of Single-A baseball stadiums
List of Carolina League stadiums
List of Florida State League stadiums

References

General reference

External links

California League
California League stadiums
 
California League stadiums